The 2022 KNSB Dutch Sprint Championships in speed skating were held in Heerenveen at the Thialf ice skating rink from 22 January to 23 January 2022. The tournament was part of the 2021–2022 speed skating season. Tijmen Snel and Michelle de Jong won the sprint titles. The sprint championships were held at the same time as the 2022 KNSB Dutch Allround Championships.

Schedule

Medalist

Men's sprint

Women's sprint

Source:

References

KNSB Dutch Sprint Championships
KNSB Dutch Sprint Championships
2022 Sprint
KNSB